Vere Fane, 4th Earl of Westmorland  (13 February 1645 – 29 December 1693), styled The Honourable Vere Fane from 1644 to 1661 and Sir Vere Fane from 1661 to 1691, was a British peer and Member of Parliament for Peterborough and twice for Kent.

Family
Vere Fane was born on 13 February 1645 in Lamport Hall, Lamport, Buckinghamshire as the second son of Mildmay Fane, 2nd Earl of Westmorland and his wife Mary Vere; he was the younger half-brother of Charles Fane. As Charles died without issue in 1691, Vere inherited the Earldom of Westmorland. On 13 July 1671, Fane married Rachel Bence, daughter of John Bence and Judith Andrews, at Allhallows', London. The couple had eleven children:
Lady Rachel Fane
Lady Catherine Fane (whose great-grandson would become the 12th Lord le Despencer). She married (marriage licence dated 21 February 1696) William Paul (1673–1711), of Bray, Berkshire. One of their co-heiress daughters married Sir William Stapleton, 4th Baronet.
Lady Elizabeth Fane
Lady Susan Fane
Lady Rachel Fane
Lady Mary Dashwood, mother to Francis Dashwood, who inherited the Le Despencer barony upon the death of John Fane
John Fane (died in infancy)
Vere Fane, 5th Earl of Westmorland (1678-1698)
Thomas Fane, 6th Earl of Westmorland (1681–1736)
John Fane, 7th Earl of Westmorland (1686–1762)
The Honourable Mildmay Fane (1689–1715)

Fane died on 29 December 1693, probably from complications that arose from diabetes. His oldest surviving son Vere inherited his father's earldom and further titles, but died without issue before reaching the age of 20.

Career

As was common in his family (his grandfather Francis, his father Mildmay and his older brother Charles had been Members of Parliament before they became earl; his sons John and Mildmay would do so as well), Vere Fane served as a Member of Parliament. From 1671 to 1671, he was Member of Parliament for Peterborough; the year his Kent office ended, he became Member of Parliament for Kent, an office which he held until 1681. From 1689 to 1691, he was again Member of Parliament for Kent. He was classed as a Whig, but it seems that he was not particularly active. At the coronation of King Charles II on 23 April 1661, he was invested as a Knight of the Bath.

After the death of his brother Charles, who had no issue, on 18 September 1691, Vere Fane inherited the Earldom of Westmorland as well as his brother's further titles Baron Burghersh and Lord le Despencer.

References

Literature

1645 births
1693 deaths
17th-century English nobility
Deputy Lieutenants of Kent
Knights of the Bath
Lord-Lieutenants of Kent
Vere
English MPs 1661–1679
English MPs 1679
English MPs 1680–1681
English MPs 1681
English MPs 1689–1690
English MPs 1690–1695
Earls of Westmorland
Deaths from diabetes
Barons le Despencer
Barons Burghersh